Eagle Scout is the highest rank in the Scouts BSA program of the Boy Scouts of America.
 List of Eagle Scouts

Eagle Scout may refer to similar ranks in other Scout organizations:

 Eagle Scout (Boy Scouts of the Philippines)
 Pramuka Garuda (Eagle Scout), the highest rank of Gerakan Pramuka, the Indonesian Scout Association
 Eagle Award, the highest rank of the Zambia Scouts Association
 Assyrian Eagle Scouts of Australia association